Kültepe (literally "ash hill" in Turkic languages) may refer to:

Archaeological sites

Kültepe is a village and an important ancient site in Kayseri Province, Turkey
 Kültəpə, a village and site in Nakhchivan, Azerbaijan
Kul Tepe Jolfa, an ancient archaeological site in the Jolfa County of Iran

Other
 Kültepe Dam, a dam in Turkey

See also 
 Gültepe, Aksaray, a village in the central district of Aksaray Province, Turkey
 Gültepe, Kağıthane, a neighbourhood of Istanbul, Turkey